The Victorian Curriculum and Assessment Authority (VCAA) is a statutory authority of the Victoria State Government responsible for the provision of curriculum and assessment programs for students in Victoria, Australia. The VCAA is primarily accountable to the Victorian Minister for Education. It is also responsible to the Minister for Training and Skills and the Minister for Families and Children in relation to sections of Part 2.5 of the Education and Training Reform Act 2006.

Responsibilities 
The VCAA is responsible for the Victorian Early Learning and Development Framework (VELDF) and the Victorian Curriculum. The Victorian Curriculum F–10 sets out a single, coherent and comprehensive set of content descriptions and associated achievement standards to enable teachers to plan, monitor, assess and report on the learning achievement of every student. The Victorian Curriculum F–10 incorporates and reflects much of the Australian Curriculum F–10, but differs in some important respects, most notably the representation of the curriculum as a continuum of learning and the structural design. Victorian Government and Catholic schools are required to use the Victorian Curriculum F–10. Independent schools may use the Victorian Curriculum F–10 as a model and resource for the effective implementation of the Australian Curriculum.

At the senior secondary level, the VCAA provides curriculum and assessment for the Victorian Certificate of Education (VCE) and the Victorian Certificate of Applied Learning (VCAL).

Victorian Certificate of Education (VCE) 

The Victorian Certificate of Education (often abbreviated VCE) is one credential available to secondary school students who successfully complete year 11 and 12 in Victoria, it is the predominant choice for students wishing to pursue tertiary education. The VCAA conducts external assessments for units 3/4 studies which includes written examinations, oral examinations or performances based on the study. In addition, the VCAA also administers the General Achievement Test (GAT), taken by all Victorian students prior to completing their VCE.

The VCAA showcases student work through an annual festival of works created by VCE students in technology, design, multimedia and the cinematic, visual and performing arts. It also recognises student achievement through the VCE Leadership Awards, Plain English Speaking Awards, VCAL Achievement Awards and Margaret Schofield Memorial Scholarships.

International Delivery 
The VCAA has taken a leading role in expanding delivery of the Victorian curriculum internationally. The framework to support this includes a northern hemisphere timetable. In 2015-16, more than 1400 students participated in VCAA assessment programs with 25 overseas providers and in 2015, 460 students completed the Victorian Certificate of Education (VCE) with offshore providers.

Victorian Certificate of Applied Learning (VCAL) 

The Victorian Certificate of Applied Learning (VCAL) is a 'hands-on' option for students in Years 11 and 12 and is a credential awarded to secondary school students who successfully complete year 11 and 12 in Victoria, it is delivered under the VCAA. Students may work in a trade or part-time job on some days of the week and supplement this by doing a set course at school. In 2020, it was announced that the VCAL will be merged with VCE by 2023, before being wholly suspended in 2025. Education Minister James Merlino stated that a 'single VCE certificate would make it easier for students to get a range of skills, both academic and vocational.', with the suspension of VCAL also in response to the stigma that it is solely for non-academic students.

National Assessment Program – Literacy and Numeracy (NAPLAN) 
The VCAA also administers the National Assessment Program – Literacy and Numeracy (NAPLAN) which provides an indication of the literacy and numeracy skills of students. Students in Victoria undertake the testing in Years 3, 5, 7 and 9.

Extra-curricular Programs

Plain English Speaking Award 
The VCAA administers the Plain English Speaking Award (PESA) annually. PESA is a public-speaking competition for students aged 15–18 years. It is designed to provide opportunities for students to build self-confidence and extend their skills in oral communication, speech writing and research.

Controversies

2011 English exam 
In the 2011 English exam, students were required to analyse a column about tattoos, attributed to "part-time journalist and blogger Helen Day", who wrote for the fictional "Street Beat" blog. The Age newspaper accused VCAA of plagiarism as the column resembled an opinion piece featured in the newspaper's 23 September 2010 edition, written by Melbourne writer Helen Razer. Razer described VCAA's use of her piece as "misattributed" and stated that examiners had inserted poorly written "blog-speak" words she would never have used into the article. The VCAA apologised to Razer and declared a review of policies and processes on the use of recently published material in examinations.

2012 History:Revolutions exam 
In 2012, the History:Revolutions exam intended to include a picture of Nikolai Kochergin's artwork Storming the Winter Palace on 25th October 1917, as part of an image analysis question for the section on Russia. Instead, a doctored picture was used, in which a large robot had been edited in to the background of the scene. A VCAA spokesperson admitted that the image was "sourced and acknowledged by the VCAA as coming from the internet", and new internal guidelines were developed for using internet-sourced content in exams. In a statement, the VCAA apologised for any impact the error had on students completing the exam.

The VCAA forwarded answers directly referring to the robot to the Chief Examiner for review, after which 27 students had a Derived Examination Score applied. A statistical analysis of all student responses to the question was subsequently conducted. Of 2,379 students who chose to answer the Russia section, 130 received an adjusted score.

2016 Early Release of Results 
In 2016, a computer error allowed for 2075 students (approximately 2.5% of VCE candidates) to receive their ATAR score and VCE results five days earlier than they were supposed to be announced. External SMS provider for VCAA and the Victorian Tertiary Admissions Centre (VTAC), Salmat Digital, created an error that enabled students to receive their results before the expected release date by texting VCAA. Suzanne Connelly, a spokeswoman for VTAC and VCAA, apologised on behalf of all agencies involved.

This sparked outrage from parents of students who did not receive their scores, considering it as "unfair". Students who were able to receive their results also questioned its legitimacy and reliability. The VCAA and VTAC acted to contact affected students and their schools to reassure them regarding the accidental early results release. The release of the remaining 97.5% of results took place without further issue at the planned time. Education Minister James Merlino ordered an investigation into the situation, which had compromised results that are normally closely guarded until the official release.

2018 English Exam 
The 2018 English exam included an article criticising the opening of a café franchise "Calmer Coffee" in a local town, written by fictional author Jonty Jenkins. The café was criticised for its unfriendly staff and unwelcoming ambience, described as an "assault on the senses". Following the exam, students discovered a real "Calmer Café" existed in Aberfeldie, a suburb north-west of Melbourne. The café contained several similarities to the franchise mentioned in the exam, including identical surnames of fictional Jenkins to existent manager Elise Jenkins, and an employee with a "man bun" like the employer in the exam article.

Within hours, the café received over 100 negative reviews on Google Maps from Year 12 students, reducing its rating from nearly 5 stars to as low as 3.3. The café's owner, Tara Conron told The Age she had hired a lawyer and threatened legal action against the VCAA over the "uncanny" similarities, fearing damage to the café's reputation. However, in 2019 it was revealed that Conron was no longer pursuing said legal action. A VCAA spokesman stated the authority had apologised for the inadvertent similarity in business names and contacted the café seeking a meeting with the owners and manager to offer assistance and support.

References

External links

Education in Victoria (Australia)
School qualifications
School examinations
Australian Certificate of Education
Qualifications awarding bodies
Government agencies of Victoria (Australia)